Canonicus (c. 1565-1647) was a Native American chief of the Narragansett.

Canonicus may also refer to:

USS Canonicus, the name of several United States Navy ships
Canonicus-class monitor, a class of nine ships built for the Union Navy during the American Civil War
Conus canonicus, common name the tiger cone, a species of sea snail
 Father John Canonicus, who directed the building of St. Joseph's Cathedral, Criciúma, Brazil
 Canon (priest), from Latin canonicus

See also
 Canon Digital IXUS, a camera